The 1999 President's Cup was a men's tennis tournament played on hard court in Tashkent, Uzbekistan. It was part of the International Series of the 1999 ATP Tour. It was the third edition of the tournament and was held from 13 September to 18 September 1999. Third-seeded Nicolas Kiefer won the singles title.

Finals

Singles

 Nicolas Kiefer defeated  George Bastl, 6–4, 6–2.

Doubles

 Oleg Ogorodov /  Marc Rosset defeated  Mark Keil /  Lorenzo Manta, 7–6, 7–6.

See also
 1999 Tashkent Open

References

President's Cup
ATP Tashkent Open
President's Cup
President's Cup